is a shōjo manga series written and illustrated by Shioko Mizuki. It was originally serialized in Akita Shoten's Princess magazine between the March 2000 issue, and 6 June 2002. In December 2007, Go! Comi announced their license of Three in Love at the annual New York Anime Festival.

Release dates
 Japanese volumes
 21 September 2001
 15 March 2001
 4 October 2001
 20 March 2002
 22 August 2002

 English volumes
 1 July 2008
 30 November 2008
 31 March 2009

References

External links
 Go! Comi official website
 
 
 Mania review volume 1
 Mania review volume 2

Akita Shoten manga
Go! Comi titles
Romantic comedy anime and manga